The São João River is a tributary of the Dos Patos River in Paraná state, southern Brazil.

See also
List of rivers of Paraná

References

Rivers of Paraná (state)